Quebecair Express was an airline based in L'Ancienne-Lorette, Quebec, Quebec, Canada. It was established in 2003 and operated scheduled services. It was grounded at the end of January 2005, and is in negotiations to avert bankruptcy.

Former code data 
IATA code: Q0

Destinations
The airline served the areas around Côte-Nord, Gaspésie and Magdaline Islands in the province of Quebec.

As of January 2005 Quebecair Express operated services to the following domestic scheduled destinations: Chevery, Gaspé, Gethsemani, Baie-Comeau, Blanc-Sablon, Havre-Saint-Pierre, Îles de la Madeleine, Mont-Joli, Montreal, Grande-Rivière, Pakuashipi, Quebec City and Sept-Îles.

Fleet
 Saab 340

See also 
 List of defunct airlines of Canada

References

External links 
 

Defunct airlines of Canada
Airlines established in 2003
Airlines disestablished in 2005
Companies based in Quebec